Nadia Mladjao (born 5 April 1979), better known by her stage name Imany, is a French pop-soul recording artist of Comorian descent. Her debut album, The Shape of a Broken Heart, which was  released in 2011, reached platinum status in France, Greece and triple platinum in Poland.

Early life
She was born in Martigues near Marseille, in a family from the Comoros in 1979. Her stage name, Imany (Imani) means faith in Swahili (from Arabic ايمان - imaan). As a youth, she was an athlete, doing high jump.

Career
She became a model for the Ford Models Europe. She went to the United States for seven years, before coming back to France, when she started her singing career.

In 2008, she began singing. She performed at the Beau Lounge, at the Réservoir, at the Bellevilloise, and at the China Club.

Imany’s first album, The Shape of a Broken Heart, which was named after a drawing she made with closed eyes, contains twelve songs written in English.

Imany produced the soundtrack for the 2014 film French Women by Audrey Dana.

In 2016 the Filatov & Karas remix of her song "Don't Be So Shy" became a Europe-wide hit, topping the charts in Austria, Germany, Poland and Russia.

Discography

Studio albums

Extended plays

Soundtracks

Singles

As lead artist

As featured artist

Notes

References

External links 

 

1979 births
Living people
French people of Comorian descent
Black French musicians
People from Martigues
Panik Records artists
21st-century French singers
21st-century French women singers